Akua Kuenyehia (born 1947) is a Ghanaian academic and lawyer who served as judge of the International Criminal Court (ICC) from 2003 to 2015. She also served as First Vice-president of the Court. She was one of the three female African judges at the ICC.

Kuenyehia represented Ghana on the United Nations' Convention on the Elimination of All Forms of Discrimination against Women (CEDAW) committee in 2003 and worked hard to contribute to its reputation and influence.

Kuenyehia is an Honorary Fellow of Somerville College.

She is a member of the Crimes Against Humanity Initiative Advisory Council, a project of the Whitney R. Harris World Law Institute at Washington University School of Law in St. Louis to establish the world's first treaty on the prevention and punishment of crimes against humanity.

Education and early career
Kuenyehia was educated at Achimota School, University of Ghana and Somerville College, Oxford. She has spent most of her professional career teaching at the  University of Ghana, as Dean of Law, and as a visiting professor at other institutions including Leiden University and Temple University. She is the President of Mountcrest University College, Ghana. The Law Faculty Building at the University of Ghana, Legon, was named in joint honour of President John Atta Mills and Professor Kuenyehia.

Judge of the International Criminal Court, 2003–2015
In March 2009, judges chose Kuenyehia as well as Anita Ušacka of Latvia for appeals positions. Three months later, both of them had to step down from an appeal in the case of Germain Katanga of the Democratic Republic of Congo, on trial for war crimes and crimes against humanity, because they had previously issued his arrest warrant.

Personal life 
Kuenyehia is married with three children.

Books
 Women and Law in West Africa (2003). Accra, Ghana, WaLWA. 
 With Butegwa, F., & S. Nduna (2000). Legal Rights Organizing for Women in Africa: A Trainer's Manual. Harare, Zimbabwe, WiLDAF. 
 With Bowman, C. G. (2003). Women and Law in Sub-Saharan Africa. Accra, Ghana: Sedco. .

Recognition
In 2013, the University of Ghana named a newly constructed faculty of law building after Kuenyehia.

References

External links
 "Prof Akua Kuenyehia Re-Elected", Graphic Ghana, 30 January 2006.
 "Interview with Prof Akua Kuenyehia", April 2003 newsletter, WiLDAF/FeDDAF. 
 "Prof. Kuenyehia Speaks Out Against Polygamy", GhanaWeb, 19 February 2003.

20th-century Ghanaian lawyers
Alumni of Achimota School
International Criminal Court judges
1947 births
Living people
Alumni of Somerville College, Oxford
University of Ghana alumni
Ghanaian women judges
Fellows of Somerville College, Oxford
Ghanaian judges of international courts and tribunals
21st-century Ghanaian judges
21st-century women judges
Alumni of the University of Oxford